Mechanical Soul is the seventeenth full-length studio album by Vancouver industrial band Front Line Assembly. It was released on January 15, 2021 on CD, vinyl and digitally through Metropolis. It features Jean-Luc de Meyer from Belgian EBM group Front 242 and Dino Cazares from American industrial metal band Fear Factory. It contains a remix of the track "Hatevol" from the predecessor album Wake Up the Coma.

Production
The song "Stifle" features guitars by Dino Cazares from American industrial metal band Fear Factory. The collaboration came about through Fulber's close ties with Fear Factory, as he said to ReGen Magazine: "After Bill did the vocal for 'Stifle', he thought the feel of the song would benefit from some heavy guitar accents, so I just said, 'I will ask Dino.' One call, done deal." Also, the song was proposed to be on the soundtrack for the video game Cyberpunk 2077, for which Rhys Fulber had composed several tracks, but ultimately was rejected.
The track "Barbarians" with vocals by Jean-Luc de Meyer from Belgian EBM group Front 242 is a rework of the song "Future Fail" from Front Line Assembly's 2006 album Artificial Soldier. According to Fulber, vocalist Bill Leeb felt that the old song "wasn't really highlighting Jean-Luc's vocals" and suggested "to come up with a different take". Leeb wanted "something [...] slower and more epic". The remix of "Hatevol" under the moniker of producer Bryan Black's Techno project Black Asteroid was originally intended for a prior release, said Fulber: "We asked Bryan to do a remix earlier and we were going to release a single with the remix and a new song, but decided to just wait for the next album and add it on there. As the album came together, the remix wasn’t as stylistically different as before, so we thought it would be a nice contrast."

Release
On December 9, 2020, Metropolis made the track "Unknown" available to the public via SoundCloud.

Touring
In fall 2021, Front Line Assembly announced that they would be presenting Mechanical Soul on tour in the United States and in Europe in 2022. Tim Skold was added to the live line-up for both tour legs. On the American leg in May and June they were supported by Swedish EBM musician Rein while on the European leg in August they joined German band Die Krupps on "The Machinists Re-United Tour" with support by German EBM artist Tension Control.

Track listing

Personnel

Front Line Assembly
 Bill Leeb – vocals, electronic instruments, production
 Rhys Fulber – electronic instruments, programming, production, mixing (1, 2, 4–10), vocal recording (3)

Additional musicians
 Dino Cazares – guitar (6)
 Jean-Luc de Meyer – vocals (8)
 Bryan Black – remixing (11), additional production (11)

Technical personnel
 Greg Reely – mixing (3), vocal recording (1, 2, 4–10), mastering
 Chris Liebing – mixing (11)
 Damien Rainaud – guitar recording (6)
 Jeff Swearengin – additional sound design
 Dave McKean – design, illustration

References

2021 albums
Front Line Assembly albums
Metropolis Records albums
Albums with cover art by Dave McKean
Albums produced by Rhys Fulber